Lallar is a village and municipality in the Jalilabad Rayon of Azerbaijan.  It has a population of 513.

Notable natives 

 Eldar Hasanov — National Hero of Azerbaijan.

References 

Populated places in Jalilabad District (Azerbaijan)